On May 21, 2000, Pope John Paul II canonized a group of 25 saints and martyrs who had died in the Mexican Cristero War. The vast majority are Catholic priests who were executed for carrying out their ministry despite the suppression under the anti-clerical laws of Plutarco Elías Calles after the revolution in the 1920s. Priests who took up arms, however, were excluded from the process. The group of saints share the feast day of May 21.

Canonized 16 October 2016 by Pope Francis

 José Sánchez del Río

Beatified 20 November 2005 by Pope Benedict XVI

On 15 November 2005, Pope Benedict XVI issued an Apostolic Letter declaring the following individuals "blessed" and establishing their memorial feast on 20 November. November 20 is the official anniversary in the Mexican civil calendar of the start of the Mexican Revolution, with the promulgation of the Plan of San Luis Potosí in 1910 by Francisco Madero. 
 Anacleto González Flores
 José Dionisio Luis Padilla Gómez
  Jorge Ramon Vargas González
  Ramón Vicente Vargas González
  José Luciano Ezequiel Huerta Gutiérrez
  Salvador Huerta Gutiérrez
  Miguel Gómez Loza
  Luis Magaña Servín
  Jose Trinidad Rangel Montano
  Andreas Sola y Molist C.F.M.
  Leonardo Perez Larios
  Darío Acosta Zurita

Canonized 21 May 2000 by Pope John Paul II

 Cristóbal Magallanes Jara (1869–1927)
   Román Adame Rosales (1859–1928)
   Rodrigo Aguilar Alemán (1875–1927)
   Julio Álvarez Mendoza (1866–1927)
   Luis Batis Sáinz (1870–1926)
   Agustín Caloca Cortés (1898–1927)
 Mateo Correa Magallanes (1866–1927)
 Atilano Cruz Alvarado (1901–1928)
   Miguel De La Mora (1874–1927)
   Pedro Esqueda Ramirez (1897–1927)
   Margarito Flores García (1899–1927)
   José Isabel Flores Varela (1866–1927)
   David Galván Bermudes (1882–1915)
   Salvador Lara Puente (1905–1926)
   Pedro de Jesús Maldonado (1892–1937)
   Jesús Méndez Montoya (1880–1928)
   Manuel Moralez (1898–1926)
   Justino Orona Madrigal (1877–1928)
   Sabas Reyes Salazar (1879–1927)
 José María Robles Hurtado (1888–1927)
   David Roldán Lara (1907–1926)
 Toribio Romo González (1900–1928)
 Jenaro Sánchez Delgadillo (1886–1927)
   Tranquilino Ubiarco Robles (1899–1928)
   David Uribe Velasco (1888–1927)
These saints were also canonized on 21 May 2000 but were not martyred in the Cristero War:
 José Maria de Yermo y Parres (1851–1904)
 María Natividad Venegas de la Torre (1868–1959)

Beatified 25 September 1988 by Pope John Paul II

 Miguel Pro

Beatified 12 October 1997 by Pope John Paul II
 Mateo Elías Nieves Castillo

Luis Bátiz Sainz
Luis Bátiz Sainz was born on September 13, 1870. He attended a minor seminary from age 12, and was ordained on January 1, 1894. He worked as spiritual director of the seminary and as parish priest in Chalchihuites, Zacatecas, and was a member of the Knights of Columbus. He was noted for his pastoral zeal and capacity to organize the parish. He founded a workshop for Catholic workers and a school.

Bátiz spent a great part of his time on the catechesis of children and adults, and was very fervent in his Eucharistic adoration. He is reported to have said, "Lord, I want to be a martyr; though I am your unworthy minister, I want to shed my blood, drop by drop, for your name."

Before the closure of the churches in 1926, a meeting of the National League for the Defense of Religious Liberty discussed the possibility of armed rebellion to overthrow the government. Fr. Bátiz spoke at this meeting and was denounced to the government. When the churches were closed, he moved to a private house, where he was captured by government soldiers on August 14, 1926. Although there was a public outcry, the government decided to execute the priest. The next day, on the pretext of transferring him to Zacatecas, soldiers took him and three members of the Mexican Association for Catholic Youth, putting them in a car for transport. Underway, the four men were taken from the car and shot on the side of the road by a firing squad.

Rodrigo Aguilar Alemán
Rodrigo Aguilar Alemán was born on May 13, 1875. After his seminary training in Ciudad Guzmán, Jalisco, he was ordained a priest in 1905. He was known for his literary abilities, writing both prose and poetry. He worked in various parishes.  He was a Knight of Columbus and a member of Council 2330. He was the parish priest in Unión de Tula, Mexico. After a warrant was issued for his arrest, he took refuge at the Colegio de San Ignacio in Ejutla, where he continued to celebrate Mass and administer the sacraments. Rather than escape when soldiers arrived, Father Aguilar Alemán remained at the seminary to burn the list of seminary students, and thus protect them from being known.

On October 28, 1927, the day after his arrest, Father Alemán was led to the main plaza of Ejutla for execution by hanging. He blessed his captors and gave them his pardon, giving his rosary to one of the executioners. His captors decided to toy with Father Alemán and put his convictions to the test.  After placing the noose on his neck from the rope hanging on a mango tree, they repeatedly asked him, "Who lives?" expecting the answer  "Long live the supreme government." Instead he shouted the Cristero motto: "Long live Christ the King and Blessed Mary of Guadalupe!" They pulled on the rope and suspended him briefly, then lowered him and asked again. This happened three times (with each time Alemán repeating the Cristero motto). The third time he was suspended, Father Alemán died. He was buried in the parish church at Tula.

Agustín Caloca Cortés
Agustín Caloca Cortés was born in San Juan Bautista de Teúl on May 5, 1898. He attended the seminary in Guadalajara, Jalisco, but was sent back to his family when the building was sacked during the Mexican Revolution. He continued his studies in a clandestine auxiliary seminary. In 1919, he was able to return to Guadalajara and was ordained on August 15, 1923. His priestly assignment was to the parish of Totatiche and to the prefecture of the seminary.

Government troops closed in to close down the seminary in late May 1927. Fr. Caloca Cortés directed the students to flee to safety and he tried to do the same, but he was captured by a group of soldiers. He was held in the jailhouse of Totatiche, together with Fr. Cristóbal Magallanes. General Goñi ordered his transfer to Colotlán, where Caloca was executed by firing squad in the burned city hall building on May 25, 1927. His heart was found to be incorrupt when his body was returned to the parish of Totatiche in 1933.

Román Adame Rosales

Román Adame Rosales was born on February 27, 1859. He studied for the priesthood in Guadalajara, Jalisco, and was ordained on November 30, 1890. He worked in various parishes, showing a profound dedication to the Blessed Virgin Mary and to catechesis, directing spiritual exercises, and parish schools. He founded the association "Daughters of Mary and Nocturnal Adoration". He built numerous chapels on the ranches. When the Calles Law forced the closing of the churches, he continued his ministry in private houses.

Adame was captured by government forces and tortured. He was taken to Yahualica, where he spent several days tied up, without food and water. On April 21, 1927, he was taken to an open grave, where he was executed by firing squad. His remains were later disinterred and brought to Nochistlán.

Atilano Cruz Alvarado
Atilano Cruz Alvarado was born in Teocaltiche on October 5, 1901. He worked as a ranch hand for his family until the parents decided to send him to Teocaltiche to learn to read and write. There he discovered his vocation and entered a clandestine seminary in 1918. Two years later, he was sent to Guadalajara to finish his training. He was ordained on July 24, 1927, and sent to Cuquío a year later, where the parish was being run from a ranch house, "Las Cruces".  There, on June 29, 1928, he joined his pastor, Justino Orona Madrigal, and they prayed and discussed the situation in their parish.

In the early dawn of July 1, he was apprehended by a squad of soldiers. In the jail where he was held, Fr. Orona Madrigal and his brother were there, covered with wounds. While he was praying at the foot of the bed, the soldiers shot Fr. Cruz. His still living body was thrown onto the porch together with Fr. Orona. The two were then taken to Cuquío, where their bodies were dragged through the central square, during which they died.

Miguel de la Mora
Father Miguel de la Mora of Colima was a member of the Knights of Columbus, Council 2140. Along with several other priests, he publicly signed a letter opposing the anti-religious laws imposed by the government. He was soon arrested and, with his brother Regino looking on, he was executed without a trial by a single shot from a military officer as he prayed his rosary on Aug. 7, 1927.

José Dionisio Luis Padilla Gómez
Luis Padilla Gomez was born on 9 December 1899 in Guadalajara, Jalisco, Mexico. He was an active member of the Catholic Association of Mexican Youth (ACJM) and worked closely with Anacleto Gonzalez Flores in the activities of the Association, helping the poor children and youth in a special way. The young man, known to all as Luis, spent much time praying before the Blessed Sacrament and had a deep devotion to the Blessed Virgin Mary.

On the morning of April 1, 1927, Luis was arrested in his home, together with his mother and one of his sisters. He was repeatedly beaten and insulted, then sentenced to execution. After arriving at the Colorado jail, Luis met Anacleto and the others. He told Anacleto that he wanted to go to confession. But Anacleto told the young man, "No, brother, now is not the hour to confess, but to request pardon and to pardon our enemies. God is a Father and not a judge, the One who gives you hope. Your own blood will purify you". Luis knelt down in prayer, as the executioners' bullets riddled his prostrate body.

See also

Cristero War
Rafael Guízar Valencia
List of canonizations
Martyrs of the Spanish Civil War

References

External links
Homily of Pope John Paul II from Canonization Mass

1926 in Mexico
1927 in Mexico
2000 in Mexico
Cristero War
Cristero War, Saints of the
Cristero War
Lists of Mexican people
Martyred Roman Catholic priests
Executed Mexican people
People executed by Mexico
Mexican Roman Catholic priests
Cristero War, Saints of the
Groups of Roman Catholic saints
20th-century Christian saints
Martyred groups
Lists of saints
Beatifications by Pope John Paul II
Canonizations by Pope John Paul II
1926 in Christianity
1927 in Christianity
2000 in Christianity
Indigenous Roman Catholic saints of the Americas
Victims of anti-Catholic violence in Mexico